Amar Rouaï (March 9, 1932 – November 11, 2017) was a former Algerian international football player and manager. From 1958 to 1962, he was a member of the FLN football team.

Club career
Rouaï began his career with MC El Eulma, making his debut with the senior team while aged 15. After five years with MC El Eulma, he moved to France to embark on a professional career. After two seasons with US Annemasse, he signed his first professional contract with Besançon. In 1957, he joined Ligue 1 side Angers, making 27 appearances and scoring 7 goals. However, at the end of the season, he secretly left the team to join the FLN football team. In 1962, after Algeria gained its independence, Rouaï returned to Angers. He made 15 more appearances for the club, scoring 1 goal, before buying out his contract.

International career
In 1958, Rouaï secretly left Angers to go to Tunisia and join the FLN football team in support of the Algerian independence movement. He spent the next four years traveling and playing with the team. After Algeria gained its independence, he was called up twice to the Algeria national football team. The first, in 1962, was a friendly against French club Nîmes. In the second, on July 4, 1963, he made his official debut in a friendly against Egypt.

Death
Rouai died in Annemasse at the French-Swiss border on November 11, 2017, at the age of 85.

References

1932 births
2017 deaths
Footballers from Sétif
Algerian footballers
Algeria international footballers
Algeria under-23 international managers
Algerian expatriate footballers
Expatriate football managers in Libya
Expatriate footballers in France
Algerian expatriate sportspeople in France
Algerian expatriate sportspeople in Libya
Angers SCO players
Racing Besançon players
Ligue 1 players
Ligue 2 players
MC El Eulma players
USM Bel Abbès players
ASM Oran managers
JS Kabylie managers
MC Oran managers
FLN football team players
Association football midfielders
Algerian football managers
21st-century Algerian people